Zha cai, also romanized as Cha tsai, is a type of pickled mustard plant stem originating from Chongqing, China. The name may also be written in English as cha tsai, tsa tsai, jar choy, jar choi, ja choi, ja choy, or cha tsoi.  In English, it is commonly known as Sichuan vegetable, Szechwan vegetable, or Chinese pickled vegetable, although all of these terms may also refer to any of a number of other Chinese pickles, including the several other types in the Sichuan province itself.

Production

The pickle is made from the knobby, fist-sized, swollen green stem of Brassica juncea, subspecies tsatsai. The stem is first salted and pressed, and dried before being rubbed with hot red chili paste and allowed to ferment in an earthenware jar. This preservation process is similar to that used to produce Korean kimchi.

Flavour
The taste is a combination of spicy, sour, and salty. Its unique texture—crunchy, yet tender—can only be vaguely compared to Western pickled cucumbers.  Zha cai is generally washed prior to use in order to remove the chili paste. Excess salt in the preserved vegetable is leached out by soaking in fresh water. Considered to be rich in umami, zha cai varies in spiciness depending on the amount of chili paste used in preparation.

Uses

Originating in Sichuan and believed to be one of the world's oldest types of pickles, zha cai is used in many of the various cuisines of China such as in Sichuan dan dan noodles, in soups with ground pork and mifen, and as a condiment for rice congee. It is generally sliced into thin strips and used in small amounts due to its extreme saltiness, although this saltiness can be tempered somewhat by soaking the strips in water prior to use.

A popular Chinese dish featuring zha cai is "noodles with Zha Cai and shredded pork" (榨菜肉絲麵; zhà cài ròusī miàn). Zha cai is also an ingredient of ci fan tuan, a popular dish in Shanghai cuisine.

In Japan, the pickle is common in Chinese restaurants (though it is usually less spicy, to suit Japanese tastes), and it is transliterated into Japanese as zāsai (katakana: ザーサイ; kanji: 搾菜).

Like other vegetable stems in Chinese cuisines, particularly celtuce, zha cai can also be sliced and sautéed.

Manufacturers
Fuling, a district in Chongqing, is closely associated with zha cai.  The largest manufacturer, Fuling Zhacai, manufacturers of the Wujiang (乌江, Wu River) brand, is listed on the Shenzhen Stock Exchange and in 2021 celebrated selling 15 billion packets.

See also

References

External links
Whole zhacai being sold
Zhacai article
Zhacai making article
Q&A of Zhacai with Brassica juncea var.tumida images
Horticultural information on B. juncea var. tumida
Production technique
Production method
Grading and sorting for production

Cantonese cuisine
Chinese pickles
Hong Kong cuisine
Pickles
Plant-based fermented foods
Sichuan cuisine
Stem vegetables
Vegetable dishes